Baghat (also Romanized as Bāghāt; also known as Bāgh, Bāgha, Baka, and Ḩājjīābād-e Bāghāt) is a village in Dar Agah Rural District, in the Central District of Hajjiabad County, Hormozgan Province, Iran. At the 2006 census, its population was 1,279, in 338 families.

References 

Populated places in Hajjiabad County